Guy is a 1996 American drama film directed by Michael Lindsay-Hogg, produced by Renée Missel and Vincent D’Onofrio, and written by Kirby Dick. It stars Hope Davis, Vincent D'Onofrio, Sandy Martin, Michael Massee, John F. O'Donohue and Richard Portnow. The film had its world premiere at the 53rd Venice International Film Festival in September 1996, and was released theatrically in the United States on 17 December 1997. Its United Kingdom release was on 22 May 1998. It was filmed on location in Los Angeles, California.

Plot
A youthful female filmmaker wants to film the private life of an ordinary person and starts following "Guy". He is irritated about this girl following him and tries to get rid of her, but she does not stop. Eventually he gets used to the girl with the camera and even attempts to become involved with her.

References

External links

Variety Magazine review
Sover.net review

1996 drama films
1990s American films
1990s English-language films
American drama films
Films about filmmaking
Films about obsessive–compulsive disorder
Films directed by Michael Lindsay-Hogg
Films scored by Jeff Beal
Gramercy Pictures films